Robert Page (February 4, 1765December 8, 1840) was a United States representative from Virginia.

Biography
Born at North End, Gloucester County (now Mathews County) in the Colony of Virginia, he received a liberal education from tutors at home. He attended the College of William and Mary, which he left to join the War of Independence, serving as a captain in the Virginia militia. He studied law, was admitted to the bar and practiced in Frederick County (now Clarke County) and adjacent counties. He was a planter and a member of the council of state, and was a member of the Virginia House of Delegates in 1795.

Page was elected as a Federalist, defeating Democratic-Republican John Smith, to the Sixth Congress, serving from March 4, 1799 to March 3, 1801. He resumed former activities and died at Janeville, in Clarke County. Interment was in Old Chapel Cemetery near Millwood.

References

1765 births
1840 deaths
Members of the Virginia House of Delegates
Virginia militiamen in the American Revolution
Virginia lawyers
Robert Page
People from Mathews County, Virginia
American planters
College of William & Mary alumni
Federalist Party members of the United States House of Representatives from Virginia
People from Clarke County, Virginia